Francis Quayle (1650–1716) was an Anglican priest in Ireland.

Quayle was born in the Isle of Man and educated at Trinity College, Dublin. He was Prebendary of Brigown in Cloyne Cathedral and Archdeacon of Ross from 1704 holding both preferments until his death.

Notes

Alumni of Trinity College Dublin
Manx people
Deans of Cloyne
18th-century Irish Anglican priests
17th-century Irish Anglican priests
1650 births
1716 deaths
Archdeacons of Ross, Ireland